Christian Adriana Namús Corrales (born 3 October 1987) is a Uruguayan professional boxer who held the IBF female junior middleweight title from 2017 to 2018. She also challenged for the WBC interim female light welterweight title in 2009; the WBO female light-welterweight title twice in 2011 and 2012; and the undisputed female welterweight title in 2016. As of September 2020, she is ranked as the world's fifth best active female junior middleweight by The Ring and BoxRec.

Professional career
Namús made her professional debut on 18 May 2007, scoring a four-round unanimous decision (UD) victory against Maria Eugenia Lopez at the Palacio Peñarol in Montevideo, Uruguay.

After compiling a record of 9–0 (2 KOs) she faced Lely Luz Flórez for the WBC interim female light welterweight title on 8 August 2009 at the Palacio Peñarol. Namús suffered her first professional defeat, losing via first-round technical knockout (TKO).

Two years later, after nine fights with eight wins (five by stoppage) and one no contest, she fought for her first full world title—the WBO female light welterweight title—against reigning champion Fernanda Soledad Alegre on 17 December 2011 at the Parque Municipal Eva Perón in Lomas de Zamora, Argentina. After struggling to gain a foothold in the first half of the fight, Namús began to take control in the latter half. The judges deemed the effort too little, too late, with two scoring the bout 97–93 and the third scoring it 98–92, all in favour of Alegre, handing Namús the second defeat of her career.

The pair had an immediate rematch four months later in April 2012. Alegre again won by UD, a result that was criticised by the commentary team for the Argentine broadcasters, TyC Sports. The three judges scored the bout 97–92, 96–93, and 95–94.

Following the consecutive defeats to Alegre, Namús scored five wins, one by knockout (KO), before facing the reigning undisputed welterweight champion Cecilia Brækhus for the WBA, WBC, IBF, WBO, and vacant IBO female titles. The bout took place on 27 February 2016 at the Gerry Weber Stadion in Halle, Germany. Namús suffered the fourth defeat of her career, losing by a shutout UD with all three judges scoring the bout 100–90.

After a six-round UD victory against Marisa Nuñez in April 2017, Namús faced Yamila Reynoso for the vacant IBF female junior middleweight title on 12 August at the Palacio Peñarol. In a fight which saw Reynosa receive a point deduction for use of her head, Namús captured the vacant IBF title with a wide UD victory, with the three judges' scorecards reading 100–89, 99–90, and 98–91.

She retained her title with a UD victory against Katia Alvariño in October 2017 before facing Marie-Eve Dicaire on 1 December 2018 at the Videotron Centre in Quebec City, Canada. After the ten rounds were complete Namús lost her title via UD in her second defence, with two judges scoring the bout 97–93 and the third scoring it 96–94.

Professional boxing record

References

External links

Living people
1987 births
Sportspeople from Montevideo
Uruguayan women boxers
Light-welterweight boxers
Welterweight boxers
Light-middleweight boxers
International Boxing Federation champions